Gymnocalycium horstii is a globular cactus resembling a loaf of bread from a bakery. Plants have a squat appearance and spines that are curved back towards the body. Plants usually offset over time, creating interesting specimens. The body of this species is glossy and the flower is always white. Its close relative Gymnocalycium buenekeri which occurs 200 km westward has a very similar but dull body with always pink flowers. Gymnocalycium horstii occurs only in the southern Brazilian province of Rio Grande do Sul and has been considered endangered since 2010 due to wild specimens being collected for the plant trade.

Notes

References

horstii
Cacti of South America
Flora of Brazil